The 2019–20 Cal State Northridge Matadors men's basketball team represented California State University, Northridge in the 2019–20 NCAA Division I men's basketball season. The Matadors, led by second-year head coach Mark Gottfried, played their home games at the Matadome in Northridge, California as members of the Big West Conference. They finished the season 15–17, 10–6 in Big West play to finish in a tie for second place. They were set to be the No. 2 seed in the Big West tournament. However, the Big West tournament was canceled amid the COVID-19 pandemic.

Previous season
The Matadors finished the 2018–19 season 13–21 overall, 7–9 in Big West play, finishing in a tie for 6th place. In the Big West tournament, they were defeated by UC Santa Barbara in the quarterfinals. They were invited to the CBI, where they fell to Utah Valley in the first round.

Roster

Schedule and results

|-
!colspan=12 style=| Exhibition

|-
!colspan=12 style=| Non-conference regular season

|-
!colspan=9 style=| Big West regular season

|-
!colspan=12 style=| Big West tournament
|-

|-

Source

References

Cal State Northridge Matadors men's basketball seasons
Cal State Northridge Matadors
Cal State Northridge Matadors men's basketball
Cal State Northridge Matadors men's basketball